Two ships of the United States Navy have borne the name USS Reprisal, promising hostile action in response to an offense.

  was a brig purchased by the American Continental Congress to serve in the American Revolutionary War.

United States Navy ship names